The Africa Zone was the unique zone within Group 3 of the regional Davis Cup competition in 2022. The zone's competition was held in round robin format in Algiers, Algeria, from 10 to 13 August 2022.

Participating nations

Draw
Date: 10–13 August 2022

Location: Tennis Club de Bachdjarah, Algiers, Algeria (clay)

Format: Round-robin basis. Two pools of two teams. Two pools of four teams and nations will play each team once in their group. The two group winners will automatically earn promotion to the World Group II play-offs in 2022. The two second-placed teams will fight for the third remaining promotion spot. The four teams finishing in third and last place will fight to avoid relegation to Africa Group IV.

Seeding

 1Davis Cup Rankings as of 7 March 2022

Round Robin

Pool A

Pool B

Standings are determined by: 1. number of wins; 2. number of matches; 3. in two-team ties, head-to-head records; 4. in three-team ties, (a) percentage of sets won (head-to-head records if two teams remain tied), then (b) percentage of games won (head-to-head records if two teams remain tied), then (c) Davis Cup rankings.

Playoffs

 ,  and  qualify for the 2023 Davis Cup World Group II Play-offs

Round Robin

Pool A

Zimbabwe vs. Ivory Coast

Benin vs. Mozambique

Zimbabwe vs. Benin

Mozambique vs. Ivory Coast

Zimbabwe vs. Mozambique

Benin vs. Ivory Coast

Pool B

Morocco vs. Algeria

Kenya vs. Namibia

Morocco vs. Kenya

Namibia vs. Algeria

Morocco vs. Namibia

Kenya vs. Algeria

Play-offs

1st place play-off

Ivory Coast vs. Morocco

Promotion play-off

Namibia vs. Zimbabwe

Relegation play-offs

Benin vs. Kenya

Algeria vs. Mozambique

References

External links
Official Website

Davis Cup Europe/Africa Zone
Africa Zone